Jan Kopp (born 13 July 1971) in Pforzheim, West Germany, is a German composer of contemporary music. He also works as an essayist and teacher.

Life
At age twelve, he wrote his first compositions. From 1987 to 1991 he studied composition with Wolfgang Rihm at the "Hochschule für Musik Karlsruhe". From 1992 to 2000 he studied German philology and musicology at the University of Heidelberg, finishing this studies in 2000 as a Master of Arts. From 1998 he continued his studies in composition with Helmut Lachenmann and Marco Stroppa at the Stuttgart Musikhochschule and took his diploma as a composer in 2002. Since then he has been working as a freelance composer and writer. In his work both as a composer and a writer, Kopp focuses on the relationships between music and speech. Therefore many of his works include the human voice. In his instrumental music he explores the relationships between performing music and the compositional structures and decisions made by the composer. Kopp worked with ensembles like Neue Vocalsolisten Stuttgart, Ensemble Modern, Ensemble Phorminx, Schola Heidelberg, Ensemble Mosaik, Suono Mobile and soloists like Petra Hoffmann, Daniel Gloger and Hans-Jörg Mammel. His works have been performed and broadcast in Germany, Switzerland, Argentina, Uruguay and South Korea.

In addition to composing and writing about new music, he is committed to familiarising people with works of art. For that purpose Kopp is engaged in several school projects.

External links
 www.jan-kopp.de – Own Homepage of Jan Kopp
 Playlist "Deutschlandfunk"
 Jan Kopp at the "Berliner Festpielen / MaerzMusik"

1971 births
Living people
21st-century classical composers
German male classical composers
German opera composers
Male opera composers
Hochschule für Musik Karlsruhe alumni
People from Pforzheim
State University of Music and Performing Arts Stuttgart alumni
21st-century German composers
21st-century German male musicians